Ampd Energy is a company in the energy industry, which designs and manufactures energy storage systems (ESS). It is a member of the Incu-Tech Programme, a Hong Kong Government and HK Science and Technology Park initiative. Their mission is to provide clean, affordable and stable electricity to people and enterprises that lack access to a reliable electric supply.

History 
Ampd was founded in December 2014. Its founders, Brandon Ng and Luca Valente created an electric motorcycle company during a blackout in the city, they reasoned that the batteries of their motorcycles could be redesigned to power buildings.

In February 2015, Ampd Energy was accepted into the Incu-Tech program. As of June 2017, the company has raised a total of $3.7 million in seed investment.

Product 
In December 2016, the company launched an energy storage system called Ampd Silo, which aims to replace lead acid battery, Uninterruptable Power Supply systems (UPSs) and diesel generators primarily in countries affected by frequent blackouts.

Unlike many related companies such as Tesla and Sonnen, The Ampd Silo is primarily aimed at on-grid energy storage.

The Ampd Silo uses 1,792 rechargeable lithium-ion batteries cells, with each Ampd Silo offering a storage capacity of 16.8 kWh.

Awards and recognition 
In early 2017, Ampd Silo received the CES2017 Innovation Award Honoree in the "Tech For a Better World" category. The company was also shortlisted as one of the finalists in Engadgets best CES 2017 in the start-up category.

In May 2017, co-founder and CEO, Brandon Ng, was named as a Forbes Asia 30 Under 30 honouree in the "Industry, Manufacturing & Energy" category.

See also 
Lithium-ion battery
Energy storage
Standby generator
Uninterruptible power supply
Particulates

References

External links 
 Official website
 
 
 

Energy companies of Hong Kong
Energy storage
Energy companies established in 2014
Chinese companies established in 2014